Michelle Alyssa Go (December 29, 1981 – January 15, 2022) was a 40-year-old Asian-American woman who, according to police, was pushed into the path of an oncoming New York City subway train, which caused her death. The suspect is Martial Simon, a homeless man who was subsequently arrested and charged with second-degree murder. The incident occurred at the Times Square–42nd Street/Port Authority Bus Terminal station.

Biography 
Go was born to Justin and Marjorie Go on December 29, 1981, in Berkeley, California. She grew up in Fremont, California, with her parents and her brother Jefferey. Circa 1994, she attended American High School in Fremont, where she was a member of the Honor Society as well as a cheerleader. She graduated in 1998. She studied economics at University of California, Los Angeles, graduating with a degree in economics in 2002. She first worked at Ferguson Plumbing Supply in Pasadena, California, as a customer service and sales representative.

In 2010, she obtained a Master of Business Administration from the New York University Stern School of Business. She worked at Barclays Capital, before joining financial firm Deloitte, where she worked in mergers and acquisitions.

Go was known for her volunteer work. She had worked with the New York Junior League (NYJL) for over a decade, helping many low-income New Yorkers. The NYJL released a statement after her death.

Death 
On January 15, 2022, Go left her apartment on the Upper West Side of New York City and was waiting for an R train at Times Square-42nd Street station. According to police, Go was pushed from behind onto the tracks into the path of the oncoming R train at about 9:30am. The perpetrator was identified as a 61-year-old homeless man named Martial Simon. Go was pronounced dead at the scene. Simon fled the scene but later surrendered and admitted guilt.

Legal proceedings
Simon was convicted of attempted robbery in 1999 and 2019 and had a warrant out for violating his parole. Shortly before the incident, he had allegedly been harassing other commuters. Another woman later told investigators that she had also been approached by Simon and that she felt threatened by him, so she walked away from him. Simon turned himself in to police shortly after the incident, and has been charged with second-degree murder.

According to the police, Simon has a history of mental illness. Attorney Mitchell Schuman of NYC Defenders said that, instead of understanding the complex issue of a city with "so many unhoused black people with unaddressed mental illness", it would be a shame if "Mr. Simon was sacrificed at the altar of vengeful public opinion." On April 19, 2022, Simon was deemed unfit to stand trial and indefinitely committed to a locked psychiatric facility.

Reception and concern
Go's death received attention due to its unprovoked malice. The media and investigators speculated about whether she was targeted because she was Chinese American. Vigils, organized in the San Francisco Bay Area and New York City, were attended by hundreds of mourners. The case has inflamed concerns over the homelessness and mental illness crises and elevated fears of soaring rates of violent hate crime, with residents calling for better security and social policies.

Following Go's death, the Metropolitan Transportation Authority (MTA) announced in February 2022 that it would install platform screen doors at three stations as part of a pilot program. Even before Go's death, there had been calls for the MTA to install platform screen doors at several stations, but the MTA had not done so. The pilot program at Times Square does not include the platform where Go was killed.

See also 
 2021 Atlanta spa shootings
 2022 New York City Subway attack — The mass shooting that occurred 4 months later
 Interminority racism in the United States
 Killing of Vicha Ratanapakdee — Thai-American man pushed to his death in San Francisco in 2021
 Killing of Yao Pan Ma — Chinese-American man kicked to death in East Harlem in 2021

References 

2022 controversies in the United States
2020s in Manhattan
African-American–Asian-American relations
Asian-American issues
Asian-American-related controversies
Deaths by person in New York City
January 2022 crimes in the United States
January 2022 events in the United States
Violence in New York City
Violence against women in the United States
Anti-Chinese violence in the United States
Crimes in Manhattan